Aleko is the trade name of a Russian mid-size car sold between 1986 and 1997.

Aleko may also refer to:

Arts and entertainment
 Aleko, a main character in the poem "The Gypsies" by Alexander Pushkin
 Aleko (Rachmaninoff), Sergei Rachmaninoff's first completed opera, adapted from the poem
 Aleko (film), a 1953 Soviet musical film based on the opera
 Aleko, a 1942 ballet by Léonide Massine based on the poem

People
 Aleko (given name), a list of men with the name

Places
 Aleko, Vitosha, Bulgaria, a tourist and winter sports centre
 Aleko Hydro Power Plant, Bulgaria
 Aleko Point, Antarctica